Hristo Gospodinov  (born 18 January 1979 in Sofia) is a Bulgarian retired football midfielder and currently a manager of Ludogorets Razgrad U17.

Career

Playing career
He has previously played for Yantra Gabrovo, Slavia Sofia, Belasitsa Petrich,  Minyor Pernik, Vidima-Rakovski Sevlievo, Etar 1924 and Lyubimets 2007.

Manager career
On 10 August 2017 he took over at Ludogorets Razgrad U17 after previously being a head coach of Levski-Rakovski U17.

References

External links
 

1979 births
Living people
Bulgarian footballers
Association football midfielders
First Professional Football League (Bulgaria) players
PFC Vidima-Rakovski Sevlievo players
PFC Belasitsa Petrich players
PFC Slavia Sofia players
PFC Minyor Pernik players
FC Etar 1924 Veliko Tarnovo players
FC Lyubimets players
FC Vitosha Bistritsa players